The Revolutionary Option in Morocco is a text composed by Mehdi Ben Barka and presented May 1962 in preparation for the second conference of the National Union of Popular Forces (UNFP). The text criticized moderate, compromising political action in Morocco.

Context 
In 1959, Mehdi Ben Barka broke away from the Istiqlal Party, which only operated with the consent of the monarchy and was becoming "bourgeois” and “conservative," to found the National Union of Popular Forces, or UNFP, which was aligned with the labor movement and trade unions.

Upon his return from exile in Paris, Ben Barka wrote al-Ikhtiyār ath-Thawrī fī l-Maghrib for the second conference of the UNFP held May 1962.

Editions 
The original Arabic text was published April 1966 by Dār aṭ-Ṭalīʻah in Beirut, with a foreword penned by Ben Barka July 1965 in the aftermath of the March 1965 Moroccan riots. In the context of Tricontinentalism and Third-Worldism, it was translated and published in French by François Maspero in 1966, in Spanish in 1967, and in English by Tricontinental in 1968.

References 

Moroccan literature
Third-Worldism
1960s in Morocco
Marxist works